Canal 36 is a television station in Honduras. It was briefly closed down by order of the government of Roberto Micheletti on September 28, 2009 during the 2009 Honduran constitutional crisis, along with Radio Globo, because of its support for deposed President of Honduras Manuel Zelaya, but then was re-opened. It is owned by Esdras Amado Lopez.

References

External links
CholusatSur Canal 36 Official site
CholusatSur Canal 36 Live on Honduras 504

Television in Honduras
Television channels and stations established in 2009